The 2002 Lafayette Leopards football team represented Lafayette College in the 2002 NCAA Division I-AA football season. The team was led by Frank Tavani, in his third season as head coach. 

The Leopards played their home games at Fisher Field in Easton, Pennsylvania. Most games were broadcast on the Lafayette Sports Network, or LSN.

Schedule

References

Lafayette
Lafayette Leopards football seasons
Lafayette Leopards football